Arcuate fibers can refer to:

 Internal arcuate fibers
 Anterior external arcuate fibers
 Posterior external arcuate fibers